Jania rubens, the slender-beaded coral weed, is a species of red seaweeds. It is found in European waters.

References

External links
 Jania rubens at AlgaeBase

Corallinaceae
Species described in 1816